Lev Konstantinovich Panyutin (6 March 1831 in Yelisavetgradsky Uyezd, Kherson Governorate, Imperial Russia – 13 December 1882 in Saint Petersburg, Imperial Russia) was a Russian writer, poet and journalist. Panyutin, who debuted as a published author in 1858 in Moscow with the Stikhotverenya (Poems) collection, then moved to Saint Petersburg where he started contributing to Golos, using the pseudonym Nil Admirari, and soon became a popular author of feuilletons which came out in 1872 as a separate two-volume edition. Panyutin was also writing stories, as well as critical and historical essays for Otechestvennye Zapiski, Nedelya and Budilnik.

References 

1831 births
1882 deaths
People from Yelisavetgradsky Uyezd
Russian writers
Russian male poets
Russian male essayists
Journalists from the Russian Empire
Russian male journalists
Male writers from the Russian Empire